is a Japanese manga series written by Shinya Umemura and Takumi Fukui and illustrated by Ajichika about a fighting tournament featuring prominent historical figures against gods from various mythologies, with the fate of mankind in the balance. It began in Coamix's (formerly also published by Tokuma Shoten) seinen manga magazine Monthly Comic Zenon in November 2017. It was licensed in North America by Viz Media in June 2021. The manga was adapted as an original net animation (ONA) by Graphinica and premiered on Netflix in June 2021. A second season by Graphinica and Yumeta Company premiered in January 2023.

Plot
The Gods' Council assembles once every millennium to decide the fate of humanity, deciding that mankind's 7 million years of irredeemable history gives justification for their extinction. But the valkyrie Brunhilde proposes giving humanity one last chance to prove their worth and the gods agree to hold the tournament of Ragnarök, where humanity will be spared if they can best the gods in seven out of thirteen matches. Humanity's representatives are the Einherjar, notable humans across history who are each granted a valkyrie who becomes a powerful weapon tailored for their user's combat style called "Volund", at the risk of losing her life if the user is killed.

Characters

Valkyries

The eldest of the valkyries and their leader, she convinces the gods to hold the Ragnarok. She despises the gods and takes advantage of the situation to enact her revenge at them.

Brunhilde's youngest sister and a valkyrie in training.

The fourth of the 13 valkyrie sisters. She performed a Völundr with Lü Bu in round 1, turning into the "Sky Piercer", a halberd.

The seventh of the 13 Valkyrie sisters. She performed a Völundr with Adam in round 2, turning into a knuckleduster.

The second of the 13 Valkyrie sisters. She performed a Völundr with Kojiro Sasaki in round 3, turning into the "Monohoshizao", an ōdachi. Due to Hrist's Bipolar Personality the sword is able to reform itself into a daishō set of katana.

The eleventh of the 13 Valkyrie sisters. She was forced into performing a Völundr with Jack the Ripper in round 4, turning into a pair of gloves that could turn anything into a divine weapon.

The third of the 13 Valkyrie sisters. She performed a Völundr with Raiden Tameemon in round 5, turning into the "Mawashi of Flesh and Bone", a special mawashi that allowed Raiden to completely manipulate his own muscles.

The tenth of the 13 Valkyrie sisters. She performed a Völundr with Qin Shi Huang in round 7, turning into a pair of spaulders, known as the "Shenluo Kaixiu" or "Almighty Spaulders", and later reformed into a sword known as the "Shi Huang Goujian Sword".

The ninth of the 13 Valkyrie sisters. She performed a Völundr with Nikola Tesla in round 8, turning into materials that allowed Tesla to complete his special set of armour, known as the "Super Automaton β".

Human representatives
Known as the Einherjar, they are thirteen humans that Brunhilde personally selected to participate in Ragnarok, later joined by Buddha.

A military general and warlord who lived during the late Eastern Han dynasty of Imperial China and humanity's representative for the first match, fighting and losing against Thor. His weapon is the Sky Piercer, a halberd granted by the valkyrie Randgriz, whose special ability allows Lu Bu to break any armor.

The progenitor of all humanity who fights and loses against Zeus in the second match. Designed in the image of a god, Adam can perfectly replicate any move and technique he lays his eyes upon. His weapon is a knuckleduster, granted by the valkyrie Reginleif.

A famous Japanese swordsman who fights and wins in the third match against Poseidon. His weapon is the Monohoshizao, a two-handed nodachi granted by the valkyrie Hrist, whose special ability allowed her to transform into two weapons after the Monohoshizao was shattered.

An infamous British serial killer from the late 19th century who fights and wins in the fourth match against Heracles. He wears a pair of gloves granted by the valkyrie Hlökk, whose special ability allows Jack the Ripper to turn anything his gloves touch into a divine weapon.

The highest-rated Japanese sumo wrestler from the 19th century who fights and loses in the fifth match against Shiva. He wears a mawashi granted by the valkyrie Thrud, which gives him complete control over his body's muscles.

A former human who founded Buddhism, known as "The Enlightened One". Despite having attained godhood, Buddha decides to represent and win for humanity in the sixth match, much to the ire of the other gods. He initially wields the Six Realms Staff, an oversized praying wheel that can assume six different forms according to his current emotional state. During his fight with Hajun, Buddha is granted by Zerofuku’s soul to use Great Nirvana Sword Zero.

The founder of the Qin dynasty and the first emperor to unify China, in the 3rd century BC, who fights and wins against Hades in the seventh match. His weapons are the "Allmighty Spaulders", granted by the valkyrie Alvitr.

A Serbian-American inventor from the 20th century, who fights in the eighth match against Beelzebub. His weapon is the "Super Automaton β", a powered exoskeleton granted by the vaklyrie Göndul.

The captain of the Shinsengumi a special police force from 19th century Japan, famed for his swordsmanship.

A French astrologer, physician and reputed seer from the 16th century.

A Finnish sniper and war veteran from the 20th century, recognized as the deadliest marksman in history.

A Spartan king from the 5th century BC, famous for his instrumental role at the Battle of Thermopylae.

A Russian mystic and self-proclaimed holy man from the early 20th century.

A Japanese folk hero from the Heian period.

Gods

The Norse god of thunder and a representative for the gods for the first match, which he wins, armed with the hammer Mjölnir.

The supreme Greek god and chairman of the Gods' Council who fights and wins the second match, fighting barehanded.

The Greek god of the sea and Zeus' older brother who fights and loses the third match, armed with a trident.

A former human and Greek god of strength and heroism who fights and loses the fourth match by the gods' side, armed with a divine club.

The four-armed Hindu god of destruction and one of the three gods that make up the Trimurti who participates in and wins the fifth match, fighting barehanded.

 A deity armed with the Misery Axe and the original form of the Japanese Seven Lucky Gods, a group of deities under  who bestow good fortune and serve as executioners of those who dare to defile the gods. Originally a kind-hearted deity who absorbed others’ misfortune, Zerofuku’s views on humanity changed upon witnessing humanity’s deprived nature and being replaced by Buddha. This made Zerofuku resent humans enough to consider killing them all, acting on the last of his kindness to stop him by splintering himself into the Seven Lucky Gods. When Bishamon represents the gods in the sixth round against Buddha, he absorbs the other Lucky Gods to resume their true form as a grudge-driven Zerofuku. The two battle to a standstil before Buddha rekindle Zerofuku’s old self, only to be consumed when Hajun reconstitutes himself to continue the fight. Zerofuku aids Buddha in spirit by performing Völundr to become his weapon to kill Hajun, dying in the process while departing in peace.

 The Demon Lord of the Sixth Heaven, Hajun is a legendary berserker whose vast power eventually destroyed his body. A demon of legend, Hajun died as the result of his body being unable to compensate his vast power. His remains were found by Beelzebub and cultivated into a seed that he planted in Zerofuku, which germinated the moment that the deity lost his resentment towards humanity. The revived Hajun consumes Zerofuku to recreate his body, taking over in the deity’s match with Buddha before being killed by the ascended human.

The Greek god of the underworld. He replaces Buddha on the gods' roster and participates in and loses the seventh match, seeking vengeance for his brother Poseidon. He wields a bident, fused with the remnants of Poseidon's trident.

A Philistine deity portrayed as a demon in Jewish and Christian lore, he fights in the eighth match, armed with the "Staff of Apomyus", a cane with both offensive and defensive capabilities, depending on which hand Beelzebub uses to wield it.

The herald of the Greek gods.

The Greek goddess of love. She is accompanied by a group of stone golems that she uses as a throne and to hold up her large breasts.

The Greek god of courage and war.

The Shinto god of the sea and storms. One of the three central deities of Japanese mythology.

The supreme Norse god, he is Thor's father and blood brother to Loki.

The Norse god of deceit and blood brother to Odin.

A Norse god who keeps watch for invaders and the onset of Ragnarök. He oversees and comments on the fights of Ragnarok.

A pair of ravens that fly all over the world, Midgard, and bring information to the god Odin. They are usually seen resting on Odin's shoulders.

The Egyptian god of death, mummifying and embalment.

The Greek god of the sun.

The Greek god of conquest and older brother of Zeus, whom he attempted to overthrow after the Titanomachy. While seemingly killed by Poseidon with his existence expunged from historical records, Adamas survived with Hades arranging for him to be made into a cyborg by Beelzebub, remaining on Helheim under the name of "Adamantine".

Media

Manga
Record of Ragnarok is written by Shinya Umemura and Takumi Fukui and illustrated by Ajichika. It began in Coamix's (formerly also published by Tokuma Shoten) Monthly Comic Zenon on November 25, 2017. Its chapters has been collected into individual tankōbon volumes. The first volume was released on May 19, 2018. As of March 20, 2023, eighteen volumes have been released.

On June 17, 2021, Viz Media announced that they had licensed the series for English release in North America. It will be released in digital starting in fall 2021 and in print starting in spring 2022.

A spin-off manga titled  was serialized in Monthly Comic Zenon from October 25, 2019, to November 25, 2022. Its chapters have been collected into individual tankōbon volumes. The first volume was released on April 20, 2020. As of December 20, 2022, seven volumes have been released.

A spin-off manga centered around the Jack the Ripper character titled Shūmatsu no Walküre Kitan - Jack the Ripper no Jikenbo began serialization in Monthly Comic Zenon on October 25, 2022. Its chapters have been collected into individual tankōbon volumes. The first volume was released on March 20, 2023.

Volume list

Record of Ragnarok

Shūmatsu no Valkyrie: Ryo Fu Hō Sen Hishōden

Anime
In December 2020, it was announced that the series would receive an anime series adaptation produced by Warner Bros. Japan and animated by Graphinica. It is directed by Masao Ōkubo, with series composition by Kazuyuki Fudeyasu, characters designs by Masaki Saito and music composed by Yasuharu Takanashi. Licensed by Netflix, the series premiered on June 17, 2021, on the streaming service. The opening theme is  performed by Maximum the Hormone, while the ending theme is  performed by SymaG. In North America, the first season has been licensed for home video release by Viz Media and is set to be released on Blu-ray on April 4, 2023.

In August 2021, it was announced that the series was renewed for a second season. The main staff is returning from the first season, with Yumeta Company producing the series alongside Graphinica, and Yuka Yamada writing the scripts alongside Fudeyasu. The season consists of 15 episodes, with the first 10 episodes premiered on January 26, 2023, while the remaining five to be released later that year. The opening theme is  performed by Minami, while the ending theme is  performed by Masatoshi Ono.

Season 1 (2021)

Season 2 (2023)

Reception
Record of Ragnarok ranked 5th on Takarajimasha's Kono Manga ga Sugoi! 2019 ranking of Top 20 manga series for male readers. The series ranked 5th on the "Nationwide Bookstore Employees' Recommended Comics of 2018". It placed 12th on the "Nationwide Bookstore Employees' Recommended Comics of 2020". In 2019, the manga ranked 20th on the 5th Next Manga Awards in the Print category. As of March 2021, the manga had over 6 million copies in circulation. As of June 2021, the manga had over 7 million copies in circulation. As of December 2021, the manga had over 9 million copies in circulation.

In October 2020, Rajan Zed, the president of the Universal Society of Hinduism Rajan, made a statement addressed to Coamix, criticizing the depiction of Hindu deities in manga and urged the company "not to trivialize Lord Shiva and other highly revered Hindu gods and goddesses in its manga publications". The anime received backlash for its depiction of Shiva by a large group of Indian Americans, calling the series "highly disturbing to them" as it trivializes the deity. To avoid further criticism, Netflix altered the trailer to remove Shiva, and later removed the anime itself from its streaming library in India.

References

External links
 
Official website at Monthly Comic Zenon 
 

2021 anime ONAs
Adventure anime and manga
Anime and manga controversies
Censorship in India
Classical mythology in anime and manga
Cultural depictions of Jack the Ripper
Cultural depictions of Qin Shi Huang
Dark fantasy anime and manga
Graphinica
Japanese-language Netflix original programming
Martial arts anime and manga
Mass media-related controversies in India
Netflix original anime
Norse mythology in anime and manga
Religious controversies in animation
Religious controversies in comics
Religious controversies in television
Seinen manga
Television series about Jack the Ripper
Tokuma Shoten manga
Viz Media manga
Yumeta Company